Averchenko is a gender-neutral Slavic surname. Notable people with the surname include:

Arkady Averchenko (1881–1925), Russian playwright and satirist
Evgeniy Averchenko (born 1982), Kazakh footballer

Slavic-language surnames